Kim Ji-an is a South Korean actress. She is known for her roles in drama such as My Lawyer, Mr. Jo, Moonshine, One More Happy Ending and Three Bold Siblings. She also appeared in movies The Co Artists, The Artist: Reborn, Luck Key and Will This Love Be Reached?.

Filmography

Television series

Web series

Film

References

External links 
 
 

1992 births
21st-century South Korean actresses
Living people
South Korean television actresses
South Korean film actresses